Ober may refer to:

 Ober, a 2006 Dutch black comedy film
 Ober (playing card), a playing card value in the German and Swiss decks of cards
 Ober, Indiana, an unincorporated community
 Oberek, a Polish dance

Surname 
 Bailey Ober (born 1995), American baseball player
 Caroline Haven Ober (1866 - 1929), American educator
 Christopher Ober (born 1954), Canadian-American material scientist
 Eric Ober, American  broadcasting executive
 Frederick Albion Ober (1849–1913), American writer and naturalist
 Harold Ober (1881–1959), American literary agent
 Henry Kulp Ober, former President of Elizabethtown College
 Josiah Ober, American classicist and political scientist
 Ken Ober (1957–2009), American TV host
 Margarethe Arndt-Ober (1885–1971), American opera singer
 Philip Ober (1902–1982), American actor
 Robert Ober (died 1950), American stage and silent-screen actor

See also 
 Obersee (disambiguation)
 Oberst (disambiguation)

ru:Обер